Dichagyris flavina is a moth of the family Noctuidae. It is found in most of the Balkans and through large parts of the Near East and Middle East. It has been recorded from Bulgaria, Romania, North Macedonia, Greece, Turkey, southern Russia, Armenia, Syria, Lebanon, Israel, Jordan, Iran and Iraq.

The wingspan is 35–44 mm. Adults are on wing from May to July. There is one generation per year.

Subspecies
Dichagyris flavina flavina
Dichagyris flavina pretiosa (Romania to Yugoslavia)

External links
 Noctuinae of Israel

flavina
Moths of Europe
Moths of Asia
Moths described in 1852